Riviera Hotel or Hotel Riviera may refer to:

in Ukraine
 Hotel Riviera, Kyiv, Ukraine

in Cuba
Hotel Habana Riviera, Havana, Cuba

in England
 Riviera Hotel, Bowleaze Cove, Dorset

in Spain
Hotel Riviera (Ibiza)

in Lebanon
Riviera Hotel Beirut

in the United States
 Riviera Hotel (Hot Springs, Arkansas), listed on the NRHP in Garland County, Arkansas
 Riviera (hotel and casino), on the Las Vegas Strip
 Riviera Hotel in Palm Springs, California
 Disney's Riviera Resort, in Bay Lake, Florida